Euriphene karschi, or Karsch's nymph, is a butterfly in the family Nymphalidae. It is found in eastern Nigeria, Cameroon, Gabon, the Republic of the Congo and the Democratic Republic of the Congo. Its natural habitat is forests.

References

Butterflies described in 1894
Euriphene
Butterflies of Africa